The San Dionisio Church Ruins are a historic ruins on Route 2 in Umatac, Guam. They are the remains of a church that was built in 1862 and destroyed by an earthquake in 1892. The ruins are the only surviving remnant of the Spanish colonial headquarters complex that stood in this area. The first San Dionisio Church was constructed in 1681, but rebuilt after a fire three years later. That church was destroyed in 1849 by an earthquake, and portions may have been used in construction of the 1862 building. A new church was built in 1939. The ruins were added to the National Register of Historic Places in 1974.

See also
National Register of Historic Places listings in Guam

References

External links
 

Roman Catholic churches in Guam
Buildings and structures on the National Register of Historic Places in Guam
1862 establishments in the Spanish East Indies
1862 establishments in Oceania
19th-century establishments in Guam
1892 disestablishments in the Spanish East Indies
1892 disestablishments in Oceania
19th-century disestablishments in Guam